Mount Pan is a mountain in Jizhou District, Tianjin, People's Republic of China. It has an area of 20 square kilometers and its highest peak is 858 meters above the sea level.

References

External links
 Pan Shan Online

Mountains of Tianjin